William E. Hart (1843 – October 21, 1874) was a Union Army soldier during the American Civil War. He received the Medal of Honor for gallantry during the Valley Campaigns of 1864 & 1865. Hart was instrumental in the capture of Confederate cavalry raider Colonel Harry Gilmor on February 4, 1865.

Hart enlisted in the Army from Rushville, New York in October 1861, and mustered out with his regiment in June 1865.

Medal of Honor citation
"The President of the United States of America, in the name of Congress, takes pleasure in presenting the Medal of Honor to Private William E. Hart, United States Army, for extraordinary heroism on 1864 & 1865, while serving with Company B, 8th New York Cavalry, in action at Shenandoah Valley, Virginia, for gallant conduct and services as scout in connection with capture of the guerrilla Harry Gilmore."

See also
List of Medal of Honor recipients
List of American Civil War Medal of Honor recipients: G-L
8th New York Volunteer Cavalry Regiment

Notes

References

External links
Military Times Hall of Valor
Findagrave entry

1843 births
1874 deaths
People of New York (state) in the American Civil War
Union Army soldiers
United States Army Medal of Honor recipients
American Civil War recipients of the Medal of Honor